Première is a French film magazine based in Paris and published by Hachette Filipacchi since 1976. Editions are, or have been, published in other markets.

History
The French film magazine Première was launched in November 1976 by Jean-Pierre Frimbois and Marc Esposito and originally published by the Lagardère Group. From 2016, it has been published by Hildegarde.

US edition
The U.S. version of the magazine was launched by News Corporation, based in New York City and Los Angeles, with its July/August 1987 edition. Their mission was to "reflect The Second Golden Age of the Movies". Susan Lyne was the founding editor, and among those working for the magazine was Peter Biskind, who spent a decade at the magazine as executive editor. He said that, early on, the magazine "gave us a lot of freedom to do hard-hitting, in-depth reporting."

Critic Glenn Kenny joined the US staff in June 1996, and served as a critic and later as senior editor until it ceased publication.

News Corporation sold the magazine to K-III in 1991, and Hachette Filipacchi Media U.S. reacquired the magazine, on behalf of the founding French publisher, in 1995. After Lyne left the magazine, Chris Connelly became editor-in-chief in early 1996, while Nancy Griffin served as deputy editor. Both editors resigned suddenly in May of the same year after publisher Hachette Filipacchi's then president and chief executive, David Pecker, told Connelly to not publish a column about Planet Hollywood because of its ties to billionaire Revlon owner Ronald Perelman, who was also half-owner of Premiere. James B. Meigs was listed as the editor-in-chief from the August 1996 issue.

Premiere's editor, Peter Herbst, was appointed senior vice president and group editorial director for Hachette Filipacchi Media U.S. in 2002. From 1995 to 2000, Herbst was editor-in-chief of Family Life magazine.

End of U.S. edition
On March 5, 2007, publisher Hachette Filipacchi Media U.S. announced that it was shutting down the U.S. print edition of Premiere and that the magazine would survive as an online-only publication.

The last published issue was released in April 2007 and featured Blades of Glory star Will Ferrell on its cover.

The online version only lasted for a few years, and the magazine ceased all operations in 2010.

Other international editions

Japan
A Japanese edition was launched in 1990, published by Kadokawa Shoten.

UK
In September 1992, a UK edition was released, published by Emap Metro and edited by Barry McIlheney.

The February 1998 U.S. edition published in the United Kingdom incorporated a special UK film section. By the October 1998 edition, this was published as a separate supplement but had ceased by January 1999.

Other European editions
In addition to the original French edition, editions are also published in Poland and Spain. The Portuguese edition was canceled in October 2007. The last issue of the Czech edition was released in June 2009.

References

External links
 Official site (French)
 The Site of Movie Magazines Covers for all 230+ issues.

Film magazines published in France
Magazines published in Paris
Defunct magazines published in the United States
Film magazines published in the United States
Monthly magazines published in the United States
Magazines published in New York City
Lagardère Active
Magazines established in 1976
Magazines established in 1987
Magazines disestablished in 2007
Magazines disestablished in 2009